Aadrian Roy Thurik (born 3 April 1952) is a Dutch economist who is professor of Entrepreneurship and Economics at Montpellier Business School in France. He is also an emeritus professor at both the Free University in Amsterdam and Erasmus University Rotterdam.

References

External links

21st-century Dutch economists
20th-century Dutch economists
Living people
People from Rotterdam
Erasmus University Rotterdam alumni
Academic staff of Vrije Universiteit Amsterdam
Academic staff of Erasmus University Rotterdam
1952 births